Orlești is a commune located in Vâlcea County, Oltenia, Romania. It is composed of five villages: Aurești, Orlești, Procopoaia, Scaioși and Silea.

References

Communes in Vâlcea County
Localities in Oltenia